Destin Pipeline is a natural gas pipeline that gathers gas from the Gulf of Mexico and brings it into Mississippi.  It is owned by BP and Enbridge.  Its FERC code is 164.

See also
Horizon Pipeline

References

External links
Pipeline Electronic Bulletin Board
American Midstream – Destin Pipeline Company, LCC

Natural gas pipelines in the United States
Enbridge pipelines
BP buildings and structures
Natural gas pipelines in Mississippi